Buskerud and Vestfold University College (HBV) was a regional university college with campuses in Drammen, Kongsberg, Hønefoss and Horten in the counties of Vestfold og Telemark and Viken, Norway.

It was created as a merger of Buskerud University College and Vestfold University College on 1 January 2014. It was the second-largest university college in Norway, measured in students, after Oslo and Akershus University College. From 2016 it merged with Telemark University College to form the University College of Southeast Norway.

University of South-Eastern Norway
Education in Vestfold og Telemark
Education in Viken (county)
Organisations based in Kongsberg
Educational institutions established in 2014
2014 establishments in Norway
Educational institutions disestablished in 2016
2016 disestablishments in Norway
Universities and colleges formed by merger in Norway